The Peace Queen Cup was an invitational women's association football tournament for national teams organized by the Sunmoon Peace Football Foundation. Its three editions were all been hosted by South Korea. The foundation also organized the Peace Cup, a men's tournament featuring club teams.

Results by year

Medal summary

General statistics 
As 2010

References

 
Women's football competitions in South Korea
International association football competitions hosted by South Korea
Queen
International women's association football invitational tournaments